Indonesia competed at the 2022 ASEAN University Games in Ubon Rachathani, Thailand. 2022 ASEAN University Games will be the 20th edition of the ASEAN University Games. It will be held from 26 July to 6 August 2022 in Ubon Ratchathani, Thailand. Originally planned to take place from 13 to 22 December 2020, it was eventually rescheduled as a result of the COVID-19 pandemic.

Medal summary

Medal by sport

Medal by date

Medalists

Archery

Athletics (track and field)

Track & road events
Women

Badminton

Pencak silat 

Tanding

Sport climbing

Men
Aditya Sri Syahria
Rahmat Adi Mulyono
Panji Mohammad Paisal
Fathrul Roji
Kharisma Ragil

Women
Alivanny Ver Khadijah
Himalaya
Puja Lestari
Susan Nurhidayah
Widia Fujiyanti

Swimming

References

External links
 Website 

2022 in Indonesian sport